Véronique Tadjo (born 1955) is a writer, poet, novelist, and artist from Côte d'Ivoire. Having lived and worked in many countries within the African continent and  diaspora, she feels herself to be pan-African, in a way that is reflected in the subject matter, imagery and allusions of her work.

Biography

Early years and education 
Born in Paris, Véronique Tadjo is the daughter of an Ivorian civil servant and a French painter and sculptor. Brought up in Abidjan,  Côte d'Ivoire, she travelled widely with her family.

Tadjo completed her BA degree at the University of Abidjan and her doctorate at the Sorbonne in African-American Literature and Civilization. In 1983, she went to Howard University in Washington, D.C., on a Fulbright research scholarship.

Career 
In 1979, Tadjo chose to teach English at the Lycée Moderne de Korhogo (secondary school) in the North of Côte d'Ivoire. She subsequently became a lecturer in the English department at the University of Abidjan until 1993.

In 1984, she published her first book of poetry, Latérite / Red Earth, winning a literary prize from the Agence de Coopération Culturelle et Technique. Writing by Tadjo was included in the 1992 anthology Daughters of Africa, edited by Margaret Busby.

In 1998, she participated in the project "Rwanda: Ecrire par devoir de mémoire" (Rwanda: Writing for the sake of memory) with a group of African writers who travelled to Rwanda to testify to the Rwandan genocide and its aftermath. Her book L'Ombre d'Imana (2000) emerged from her time in Rwanda.

In the past few years, she has facilitated workshops in writing and illustrating children's books in Mali, Benin, Chad, Haiti, Mauritius, French Guiana, Burundi, Rwanda, the United States, and South Africa. In 2006 she participated in the fall residency of the International Writing Program at the University of Iowa.

Tadjo has lived in Paris, Lagos, Mexico City, Nairobi and London. She was based in Johannesburg after 2007 as head of French Studies at the University of the Witwatersrand.

Awards
Tadjo received the Literary Prize of L'Agence de Cooperation Culturelle et Technique in 1983 and the UNICEF Prize in 1993 for Mamy Wata and the Monster, which was also chosen as one of Africa's 100 Best Books of the 20th Century, one of only four children's books selected.

In 2005, Tadjo won the Grand prix littéraire d'Afrique noire and in 2016 the Bernard Dadié national grand prize for literature. Her 2021 book In the Company of Men won the Los Angeles Times Book Award for Fiction.

Works

Poetry
Latérite (Éditions Hatier "Monde noir Poche", 1984). Bi-lingual edition, Red Earth – Latérite; translated by Peter S. Thompson (Washington University Press, 2006)
A vol d'oiseau (Éditions Harmattan; 1986); translated by Wangui wa Goro with the title As The Crow Flies (Heinemann African Writers Series, 2001)
A mi-chemin (Éditions Harmattan, 2000)

Novels
Le Royaume aveugle (Éditions Harmattan, 1991); translated by Janis Mayes as The Blind Kingdom (Ayebia Clarke Publishing, 2008)
Champs de bataille et d'amour (Éditions Présence Africaine; Les Nouvelles Éditions Ivoiriennes, 1999)
L'ombre d'Imana: Voyages jusqu'au bout du Rwanda, Actes Sud, 2000); translated by Veronique Wakerley as The Shadow of Imana: Travels in the Heart of Rwanda (Heinemann AWS, 2002)
Reine Pokou (Actes Sud, 2005); translated by Amy B. Reid as Queen Pokou (Ayebia Clarke Publishing, 2009)
Loin de mon père (Actes Sud, 2010); translated by Amy B. Reid as Far from My Father (University of Virginia Press/CARAF, 2014)
In the Company of Men (Other Press, 2021)

Children's
La Chanson de la vie (1990)
Lord of the Dance: An African Retelling (Le Seigneur de la Danse; Nouvelles Editions Ivoiriennes, 1993; 1988)
Grandma Nana (Grand-Mère Nanan; Nouvelles Editions Ivoiriennes, 1996; 2000)
Masque, raconte-moi (Nouvelles Editions Ivoiriennes)
Si j´étais roi, si j´étais reine (Nouvelles Editions Ivoiriennes); translated by the author as If I Were a King, If I Were a Queen (London: Milet Publishing, 2002)
Mamy Wata et le Monstre (Mamy Wata and the Monster) (Nouvelles Editions Ivoiriennes, 1993; Prix UNICEF, 1993; bi-lingual edition London: Milet Publishing, 2000)
Le Grain de Maïs Magique (Nouvelles Editions Ivoiriennes, 1996)
Le Bel Oiseau et la Pluie (Nouvelles Editions Ivoiriennes, 1998)
Nelson Mandela: "Non à L'Apartheid" (Actes Sud Junior, 2010)
Ayanda, la petite fille qui ne voulait pas grandir (Actes Sud Junior, 2007; Nouvelles Editions Ivoiriennes/CEDA)

Further reading
 Tim Steckler, "Rootedness and Openness in The Life and Works of Véronique Tadjo (b. 1955)", South African History Online. Retrieved 12 May 2022.</ref>

References

External links

Véronique Tadjo official website
African-writing.com interview with Véronique Tadjo
"Véronique Tadjo: Discussion with an African Voice", IntoFrench.org
 Webcast at the Library of Congress, 17 October 2014.

1955 births
20th-century novelists
20th-century poets
20th-century women writers
21st-century novelists
21st-century poets
21st-century women writers
French people of Ivorian descent
International Writing Program alumni
Ivorian artists
Ivorian children's book illustrators
Ivorian illustrators
Ivorian poets
Ivorian women artists
Ivorian women children's writers
Ivorian women illustrators
Ivorian women novelists
Ivorian women poets
Living people
People from Abidjan
University of Paris alumni